The Solomon Islands Rugby League Federation (founded 10 November 2008) is responsible for trying to promote of the sport of rugby league in the Solomon Islands which is still unknown.

They are affiliate members of the Rugby League International Federation.

See also

Rugby league in the Solomon Islands
Solomon Islands national rugby league team

References

External links

2008 establishments in the Solomon Islands
Rugby league governing bodies in Oceania
Sports organizations established in 2008
Sport in the Solomon Islands